|}

The John Durkan Memorial Chase is a Grade 1 National Hunt steeplechase in Ireland. It is run over a distance of about 2 miles and 4 furlongs {2 miles 4 furlongs and 40 yards, or 4,060 metres) at Punchestown in December.

The race was first run in 1968 and it was run over a distance of 2 miles until 1973. It has been run over the present distance since then apart from in 1993 and 1994, when it was run over 2 miles and 5 furlongs. The race was renamed in December 1998 in memory of John Durkan (1967-1998), an amateur jockey and assistant racehorse trainer who died of leukemia in January 1998.

Records
 Most successful horse (3 wins):
 Min - 2018, 2019, 2020

Most successful jockey (4 wins):
 Ruby Walsh - Arvika Ligeonniere (2013), Djakadam (2015, 2016), Min (2018)

Most successful trainer (9 wins):
 Willie Mullins - Florida Pearl (2001), Arvika Ligeonniere (2013), Djakadam (2015, 2016), Min (2018, 2019, 2020), Allaho (2021), Galopin Des Champs (2022)

Winners

See also
 Horse racing in Ireland
 List of Irish National Hunt races

References

Racing Post:

National Hunt races in Ireland
National Hunt chases
Recurring sporting events established in 1968
Punchestown Racecourse
1968 establishments in Ireland